The Gudivada–Machilipatnam branch line is a railway line connecting  and  of Krishna district in the Indian state of Andhra Pradesh.

Jurisdiction 

References

Rail transport in Andhra Pradesh

Transport in Machilipatnam
5 ft 6 in gauge railways in India